The Telstra House, originally Telecom House,  is a high-rise building that is located in the Adelaide central business district on the northern side of Pirie Street. It rises 117 metres above the ground and has 23 floors.

Construction of the building began in 1984 and was completed in 1987.

A major refurbishment of the building took place in 2019.

Telstra House was originally owned by Telstra, but later sold to Australian Unity. Telstra will vacate the building in February 2023.

See also
 List of tallest buildings in Adelaide

References

1987 establishments in Australia
Office buildings completed in 1987
Skyscrapers in Adelaide
Skyscraper office buildings in Australia
Telstra